The Pump Tour was a concert tour by American rock band Aerosmith that lasted twelve months, from mid-October 1989 to mid-October 1990. The tour was put on in support of the band's second consecutive multi-platinum album Pump, released in September 1989.

Background
The Pump Tour saw the band continue its successful streak, on the heels of 1987's Permanent Vacation and its associated tour. During the course of the tour, the band charted four Top 40 singles from Pump. By the end of the tour, Pump had sold four million copies, eventually selling seven million copies.

This tour was notable as it saw Aerosmith's first return to Europe since 1977, as well as the band's first-ever performances in Australia. In addition, this tour saw the band tour North America on numerous legs, as well as perform a series of dates in Japan.

Special performances on The Howard Stern Show, Saturday Night Live, and MTV Unplugged were interspersed during the course of the tour.

Opening acts on this tour included Skid Row, Joan Jett, The Cult, Poison, Warrant, Metallica, The Black Crowes, and The Quireboys. Some of these acts were regular openers, while some opened for Aerosmith only at specific festivals or stadium shows.

During the tour, the band got to meet some of their idols. Steven Tyler met Mick Jagger backstage at a Rolling Stones concert, only the second time he had met him, and the first time he met him while sober. In addition, the band met Robert Plant and Jimmy Page, who saw the band perform on separate occasions in England. At one show, The Monsters of Rock festival at Castle Donington Leicestershire UK, Page jammed with the band on "Train Kept A-Rollin'", and at another show, he played an extended set with the band at the Marquee Club in London.

For this tour, the band employed the use of a Citation II private plane, which the band named "Aeroforce One". The plane was formerly used by Philippine dictator Ferdinand Marcos.

In September 1990, towards the end of the tour, A&R man John Kalodner remarked how Aerosmith were "maybe the biggest band in the world", thinking "Nobody else is this good right now."

Tour dates

Setlist
Average set:

 "Heart's Done Time"
 "Young Lust"
 "F.I.N.E."
 "Monkey on My Back"
 "Don't Get Mad, Get Even"
 "Janie's Got a Gun"
 "Permanent Vacation"
 "Mama Kin"
 "What It Takes"
 "Voodoo Medicine Man"
 "Red House" (The Jimi Hendrix Experience cover)
 "Draw the Line"
 "Rag Doll"
 "Sweet Emotion"
 "Dude (Looks Like a Lady)"
 "Dream On"
 "Love in an Elevator"

Encore:
 "Train Kept A-Rollin'" (Tiny Bradshaw cover)
 "Walk This Way"

Notes

References

Aerosmith concert tours
1989 concert tours
1990 concert tours